Agunnaryd is a locality and a parish situated in Ljungby Municipality, Kronoberg County, Sweden with 220 inhabitants in 2010.

Agunnaryd is chiefly associated with the industrialist Ingvar Kamprad, who founded IKEA (the A of which stands for Agunnaryd). It has one school, a kindergarten, a small supermarket named 'Matöppet', and four football teams. The little village has its own newspaper/newsletter, Agunnaryds Allehanda, that is mailed to inhabitants once a month.

The nearby lake of Agunnarydsjön, located some 300 meters from the village church, is a haven for fishing and swimming. The lake is part of the Helge å river system, extending further down into the lake of Möckeln, south of Agunnaryd.

The village's vicinity offers plenty of opportunities to experience Swedish nature, e.g.  of forest, ideally suited for hiking. The bicycle-route Sverigeleden passes right through the village. Canoeing on Helge å is a popular activity among tourists. In Agunnaryd, there are "lay-bys" by the stream to be used by canoeists.

In 2014 Ingvar Kamprad donated 53 million SEK (~US$7million) to the parish, for them to use at their discretion.

Notable people
 Halta-Kajsa
 Ingvar Kamprad

References 

Populated places in Kronoberg County
Populated places in Ljungby Municipality
Finnveden